Victor R. Middleton (born 21 September 1928) is an Australian rower. He competed in the men's coxless pair event at the 1952 Summer Olympics.

References

1928 births
Living people
Australian male rowers
Olympic rowers of Australia
Rowers at the 1952 Summer Olympics
20th-century Australian people